James McFarlane McArthur (born 7 October 1987) is a Scottish professional footballer who plays as a central midfielder for  club Crystal Palace.

McArthur started his career at Hamilton Academical and was part of the team that won the 2007–08 Scottish First Division title. He made over 190 appearances for Hamilton before joining Wigan Athletic in July 2010. McArthur helped Wigan win the FA Cup in 2013. He was transferred to Crystal Palace in the summer of 2014.

McArthur made 32 international appearances for the Scotland national team between 2010 and 2017.

Club career

Hamilton Academical
Born in Glasgow and raised in the city's Barrowfield district, McArthur attended Whitehill Secondary School and supported Rangers in his youth; he played for Rangers South BC (alongside future international colleagues Robert Snodgrass and Graham Dorrans), St Johnstone pro youth, Rangers SABC and Clyde before moving to Hamilton Academical as a youth in 2003. He made his professional debut in January 2005 against Ross County. He established himself in the Hamilton team the following season and scored his first goal in April 2006 against St Johnstone.

Such was his progress that he was given the captaincy for Hamilton against Aberdeen in February 2008 for a Scottish Cup tie and nominated for the First Division Player of the Year for the 2007–08 season. In May 2008 after helping his side to the Scottish First Division, McArthur was awarded with a new three-year contract. By the time he departed from New Douglas Park aged 22, he had played in nearly 200 matches for Accies.

Wigan Athletic
In the 2009–10 season, several English Championship and Premier League clubs, including Sheffield United, West Bromwich Albion, Leeds United and Sunderland, showed an interest in McArthur. On 5 April 2010, McArthur went on a three-day visit to Premier League club Wigan Athletic with a view to a permanent move in the summer. He signed a four-year contract at the DW Stadium on 23 July for a fee of around £500,000. The move reunited him with former Hamilton teammate James McCarthy, who had made the same move at the beginning of the 2009–10 season. On 31 January 2012, McArthur scored his first goal for Wigan in a 3–1 loss to Tottenham Hotspur, and followed it up two games later with a winning goal over Bolton Wanderers at the Reebok Stadium in a game which finished 2–1 to Wigan. McArthur extended his contract with Wigan in May 2012, with the new deal due to run until 2016. On 11 May 2013 McArthur won the FA Cup, playing the whole game in a 1–0 upset win against Manchester City. However, only three days later, Wigan were relegated from the Premier League following a 4–1 defeat against Arsenal.

Wigan rejected a first offer of £5 million from Leicester City for McArthur in August 2014, but then accepted a proposed valuation of nearly £7 million. A payment schedule was not agreed and the proposed transfer collapsed, with Leicester signing Esteban Cambiasso instead. On the last day of the summer 2014 transfer window, Wigan accepted a £7 million offer from Crystal Palace for McArthur.

Crystal Palace
On 1 September 2014, McArthur signed a three-year contract with Crystal Palace after joining from Wigan Athletic for an undisclosed fee; due to a clause in his Wigan contract, his former club Hamilton received a sell-on fee from the Crystal Palace transfer, which they used to invest in the youth system through which the player had emerged. McArthur scored his first goal for Palace on 13 December, in a 1–1 draw against Stoke City.

In February 2016, McArthur tore ankle ligaments in a 2–1 loss to AFC Bournemouth. He returned in time to take part in the 2016 FA Cup Final, which Crystal Palace lost 2–1 to Manchester United after extra time.

In May 2018, having helped his club to maintain top division status for the fifth consecutive season of his spell at Selhurst Park, McArthur was recognised by the Premier League for reaching 200 appearances in the competition.

In June 2022, McArthur signed a contract extension keeping him at the club until 2023.

International career

He was first called up to the Scotland under-21 squad in February 2008, and he made his debut at that level against Ukraine later that month.

On 16 November 2010, McArthur made his senior international debut as a second-half substitute for Charlie Adam against the Faroe Islands. He scored his first international goal on 9 February 2011, in a Nations Cup match against Northern Ireland.

As of August 2018, McArthur had made 32 international appearances and scored four goals. At this time he advised Scotland manager Alex McLeish that he wished to be excused from international games while he managed ongoing back problems. Later that year, he announced his retirement from international football.

Career statistics

Club

International

As of match played 7 October 2017. Scotland score listed first, score column indicates score after each McArthur goal.

Honours
Hamilton Academical
Scottish Football League First Division: 2007–08

Wigan Athletic
FA Cup: 2012–13

Crystal Palace
FA Cup runner-up: 2015–16

References

External links

Profile at the Crystal Palace F.C. website

1987 births
Living people
Footballers from Glasgow
Scottish footballers
Scotland under-21 international footballers
Association football midfielders
Hamilton Academical F.C. players
Wigan Athletic F.C. players
Scottish Premier League players
Scottish Football League players
Premier League players
English Football League players
Scotland international footballers
People educated at Whitehill Secondary School
Crystal Palace F.C. players
FA Cup Final players